The North Carolina Commission on Interracial Cooperation was a state affiliate of the Commission on Interracial Cooperation, established in 1921 to improve race relations by changing racial attitudes and alleviating injustice. Activities included creating pamphlets, radio programs, press releases, and  holding local meetings and conferences. The NCCIC was initially made up of a group of prominent individuals, both African American and white. Chairs of the NCCIC included William Louis Poteat, Howard Odum, and Edwin Pennick. Directors included L. R. Reynolds, Earnest Arnold, and Cyrus M. Johnson.

In 1951, the NCCIC became an affiliate of the Southern Regional Council, and changed its name to the North Carolina Council on Human Relations in 1955.

References

External links
Finding aid to the North Carolina Commission on Interracial Cooperation Records  in the Southern Historical Collection at the University of North Carolina at Chapel Hill

Further reading 

Earnhardt, Elizabeth. "Critical Years: The North Carolina Commission on Interracial Cooperation, 1942-1949," M.A. Thesis, University of North Carolina at Chapel Hill, 1971

History of African-American civil rights
Anti-racist organizations in the United States
Organizations based in North Carolina